The Portuguese football champions are the winners of the highest league in Portuguese men's football, which is the Primeira Liga.

History
Before the creation of the Primeira Liga, there was a competition called Championship of Portugal, created in 1922 as the first competition of Portuguese football. However, despite its name, it corresponds to today's Portuguese Cup and was held in a knock-out basis. Therefore, its winners are not considered Portuguese champions. 

In 1934, Campeonato da Liga da Primeira Divisão was created as the top-tier football in Portugal. The winners of Campeonato da Liga are considered Portuguese champions.

From the 1938–39 season on, Campeonato de Portugal was named Taça de Portugal, and Campeonato da Liga was named National Championship of the First Division, usually called First Division. Since 1999, Primeira Divisão has been known as Primeira Liga.

FC Porto were the first club to be crowned League champions, in the 1934–35 season.

S.L. Benfica, with 37 titles, have been crowned champions more times than any other club and dominated the league during the 1960s and 1970s. Benfica are followed by Porto with 30 titles, who dominated in the 1990s and 2000s, who in turn are followed by Sporting CP, with 19 titles, who dominated in the 1940s and 1950s. C.F. Os Belenenses and Boavista F.C. are the only two other clubs that have managed to win the league once. All five clubs are from the two largest Portuguese cities, of Lisbon and Porto respectively.

List of champions and top scorers

Performance by club
All Primeira Liga champions have come from either Lisbon or Porto.

Performance by city

Five clubs have been champions, from a total of 2 cities.

Doubles, Trebles and Quadruples
The Double, called Dobradinha in Portuguese, means winning the Primeira Liga and the Taça de Portugal in the same season. The first double was achieved by Sporting CP in 1941 and the most recent by Porto in 2022.

The Treble, called Triplete in Portuguese, usually refers either winning the domestic treble of Primeira Liga, Taça de Portugal and Taça da Liga (domestic treble) or winning a UEFA competition, the Primeira Liga and Taça de Portugal (continental treble) in the same season. The Supertaça Cândido de Oliveira does not count. Benfica is the only Portuguese club to have achieved a domestic treble by winning the Primeira Liga, Taça de Portugal and Taça da Liga in 2014, and Porto is the only Portuguese club to have achieved a continental treble by winning the Primeira Liga, Taça de Portugal and UEFA Cup in 2003, and by winning the Primeira Liga, Taça de Portugal and UEFA Europa League in 2011.

The Quadruple, called Quadriplete in Portuguese, refers to winning 4 titles in the same season. This feat has only been achieved by Porto (furthermore twice) in the 1987–88 season, when it won the European Super Cup, Intercontinental Cup, Primeira Liga and Taça de Portugal, and in the 2010–11 season when it won the Supertaça Cândido de Oliveira, Primeira Liga, UEFA Europa League and Taça de Portugal.

Teams below have made the Double:

Teams below have made the Treble:

The below teams have made the Quadruple:

See also
Portuguese football league system
Football in Portugal

References

Football in Portugal
Portugal
Primeira Liga